Feldmann is a German surname. Notable people with the surname include:
Anja Feldmann (born 1966), German computer scientist
Else Feldmann (1884-1942), Austrian writer and journalist
Gyula Feldmann (1880-1955), Jewish Hungarian football player and coach
Jean Feldmann (1905–1978), French algologist, given the standard abbreviation "Feldmann"
John Feldmann (born 1967), American musician and producer, member of band Goldfinger
Markus Feldmann (1897-1958), Swiss politician
Rötger Feldmann (born 1950), German comic book artist also known as Brösel

See also 
Killing of Susanna Feldmann, a 2018 crime which occurred in Germany
Feldmann's method, a method of titration of tannin, especially in wine
Feldman

German-language surnames